Legend of the Lost is a 1957 Italian-American adventure film produced and directed by Henry Hathaway, shot in Technirama and Technicolor by Jack Cardiff, and starring John Wayne, Sophia Loren, and Rossano Brazzi. The location shooting for the film took place near Tripoli, Libya.

Plot
In Timbuktu, experienced guide Joe January (John Wayne) reluctantly joins a Saharan treasure hunting expedition led by Paul Bonnard (Rossano Brazzi), a man obsessed with confirming his dead father's claim to have found a lost city. Dita (Sophia Loren), a woman of dubious reputation, becomes infatuated with Paul and his willingness to overlook her past. She invites herself along, despite Joe's protests. During the tough, dry ordeal, Joe and Dita become attracted to each other, raising tensions.

Just as they run out of water, they stumble upon the ancient city and a well. There, they find three human skeletons, a woman and two men. It becomes evident that Paul's father had found his woman in the arms of his guide, killed them and then himself. There is also no obvious treasure to be found. Paul's faith in his father is shattered and he becomes drunk.

However; they find the treasure after Joe deciphers the clues left by Paul's father in his bible. They load it and prepare to leave in the morning. Paul makes an attempt to seduce Dita; she rejects him and he gets into a fight with Joe, who protects her.  Joe and Dita wake up to find that Paul had sneaked away during the night, taking all the animals, supplies and  treasure with him and leaving his companions to die.

Joe and Dita pursue him on foot and eventually catch up. Paul is unconscious from dehydration. While Joe and Dita dig for desperately needed water, Paul regains consciousness.  He buries the treasure and attacks Joe from behind with a knife. Dita shoots and kills Paul. When they spot a caravan approaching in the distance, Joe and Dita are saved.

Cast
 John Wayne as Joe January 
 Sophia Loren as Dita 
 Rossano Brazzi as Paul Bonnard 
 Kurt Kasznar as Prefect Dukas 
 Youseff Daoud as Dr. Gamael
 Sonia Moser as Girl
 Angela Portaluri as Girl
 Ibrahim El Hadish as Galli Galli

Production
Legend of the Lost was directed by Henry Hathaway. Wayne and Hathaway worked together six times, beginning with The Shepherd of the Hills (1941) and ending with Wayne's Oscar-winning role in True Grit (1969). Co-author Robert Presnell, nearing the end of his career at this time, was one of Hollywood's most successful screenwriters. None of this talent managed to keep Legend of the Lost from being harshly reviewed by critics.

Wayne liked the location work in Rome and Libya. The plot is vaguely similar to another of Wayne’s movies crossing the Mojave Desert. The Roman remains of Leptis Magna in Libya were used extensively as a location for the ancient city. In the script Wayne's character refers to 'Timgad' in sardonic reference to the apparent delusions of Paul's father, despite the fact this places a considerable strain on the geography of the plot. The lost city of Timgad referred to in the film was actually the Leptis Magna ruins, a Roman city dating back to the 7th century B.C. near Tripoli, in northwest Libya, while "Timbuktu" was actually in Zliten, Libya. Headquarters for the film were located in Ghadames, where, according to the publicity material, citizens of the local villages were employed on set, as well as some native Tuaregs, an ancient desert tribe.

This film was Wayne's only collaboration on film with international cinema stars Sophia Loren and Rossano Brazzi.

The film was photographed by noted British cinematographer Jack Cardiff in Technicolor and Technirama (a wide-screen process developed by the Technicolor Corporation).

See also
 List of American films of 1957  
 John Wayne filmography

References

External links
 
 
 
 

1957 films
1950s adventure drama films
American adventure drama films
1950s English-language films
Italian adventure drama films
Films directed by Henry Hathaway
United Artists films
Batjac Productions films
Films produced by John Wayne
Films with screenplays by Ben Hecht
Films set in deserts
Films scored by Angelo Francesco Lavagnino
1950s American films
1950s Italian films